Agnieszka Radwańska was the defending champion, but she chose to participate at the Hopman Cup instead.

Ana Ivanovic won the title, defeating Venus Williams in the final, 6–2, 5–7, 6–4. It was her first title since November 2011, ending her longest title drought, and her first outdoor title since winning the 2008 French Open.

Seeds 

 Roberta Vinci (first round)
 Ana Ivanovic (champion)
 Kirsten Flipkens (semifinals)
 Sorana Cîrstea (first round)
 Jamie Hampton (semifinals, withdrew because of a right hip injury)
 Lucie Šafářová (first round)
 Mona Barthel (first round)
 Karin Knapp (first round)

Draw

Finals

Top half

Bottom half

Qualifying

Seeds

Qualifiers

Qualifying draw

First qualifier

Second qualifier

Third qualifier

Fourth qualifier

References

External links
 Main draw
 Qualifying draw

ASB Classic
2014 Singles